Neoclinus bryope, is a species of chaenopsid blenny found around Japan and South Korea in the western Pacific ocean, and around California in the eastern Pacific. It can reach a maximum length of  TL.

References
 Jordan, D.S. and J.O. Snyder, 1902 (26 Sept.) A review of the blennoid fishes of Japan. Proceedings of the United States National Museum v. 25 (no. 1293): 441–504.

bryope
Fish described in 1902
Taxa named by David Starr Jordan